Chelandion was a Byzantine galley warship, a variant of the dromōn that also functioned as a cargo transport.

History
The term chelandion is derived from the Greek word kelēs, "courser", and first appeared during the early 8th century. In the medieval Latin used in Western Europe, it was rendered chelandium or  scelandrium (and thence the 12th-century sandanum transport), while the Arabs rendered the name as shalandī (plural shalandiyyāt) and used it for a probably similar type of vessels in their own navies.

In common with the general characteristics of the dromōn type, the chelandion was a bireme galley, i.e. with two rows of oars, which provided its main means of propulsion, although it also featured one or two lateen sails, and was steered by two quarter rudders at the stern. It could also be equipped with siphons for projecting the feared Greek fire, the Byzantine navy's secret incendiary weapon.

The term chelandion is usually used interchangeably with dromōn in medieval literary sources, leading to much confusion as to the exact nature of the ship and its differences with the dromōn proper. It appears, however, that the type originated as a horse-transport (hippagōgon). This in turn implies some differences in construction from the standard dromōn: at the very least, the presence of a special compartment running the length of the vessel amidships to accommodate a row of horses would increase its beam and hold depth.

References

Sources

Byzantine ships
Galleys